Lebanon sent one athlete, Larissa Chouaib, at the 1996 Summer Olympics in Atlanta, United States.

References
Official Olympic Reports

Nations at the 1996 Summer Olympics
1996 Summer Olympics
1996 in Lebanese sport